Simon Antony Bird (born 19 August 1984) is an English comedian, actor, director and producer. He is best known for playing Will McKenzie in the multi-award-winning E4 comedy series The Inbetweeners (2008–2010), as well as its two films (2011 and 2014), and Adam Goodman in the Channel 4 comedy series Friday Night Dinner (2011–2020).

Early life
Bird was born in Guildford, Surrey, as the third of four children of Claremont McKenna College Professors Graham and Heather Bird.

Bird was educated at Cranmore School, West Horsley, the Royal Grammar School, Guildford, and Queens' College, Cambridge, where he read English. At Cambridge, Bird was the president of the Footlights, the university's sketch and theatrical group.

Career

Early comedy career
While completing a Master of Arts degree in cultural and critical studies at Birkbeck College, Bird set up the sketch comedy group "The House of Windsor" with former Footlights contemporaries Joe Thomas (who plays Simon Cooper in The Inbetweeners) and Jonny Sweet. They performed at the Edinburgh Festival in 2007 and in 2008 with a show called The Meeting, described as a site-specific comedy installation set in an actual boardroom. Bird and Thomas were also regulars on series 1 and 2 of The Weekly Show, a podcast for Channel 4 Radio (2006–07).

Bird also performs stand-up comedy and took part in Chortle's national student comedy awards in 2005, 2006, 2007 and 2008, coming second in his final attempt. He was a finalist in 2006, and was disqualified for deliberately breaking the rules in 2007.

Breakthrough
In 2008, Bird was cast in E4's teen comedy The Inbetweeners as Will McKenzie, along with Joe Thomas. He won the 2008 British Comedy Award for Best Male Newcomer and the 2009 British Comedy Award for Best Actor. He was also nominated for Best Comedy Performance at the 2008 Royal Television Society Awards, and Best Male Performance in a Comedy Programme at the 2009 BAFTA Television Awards.

Subsequent work
In 2010, Bird created a BBC Three comedy panel show The King Is Dead, in which a well-known person is hypothetically killed off and a panel of three personalities go head-to-head in a series of satirical quiz rounds and challenges in their bid to replace them. He hosted alongside Nick Mohammed and Katy Wix.

From 2011-2020 Bird starred in 6 series of Friday Night Dinner, a single-camera comedy written by Robert Popper and made by Big Talk Productions. Like The Inbetweeners it was named Best Sitcom at the Rose D'Or Festival. In 2021 Channel 4 released Friday Night Dinner: 10 Years And A Lovely Bit Of Squirrel, an anniversary special celebrating a decade of the hit sitcom.

Bird returned to the character of Will McKenzie in The Inbetweeners Movie which was released on 17 August 2011 and is the highest-grossing comedy film ever released in the UK. In 2014 he resumed the role in the second movie about the Inbetweeners, The Inbetweeners 2, which had the highest-grossing opening weekend of any film in the UK that year.

In 2013 Bird co-created, co-wrote, and co-starred in Chickens, a sitcom about three men who remain in England during World War I. It premiered on Sky1 in summer 2013 and was nominated for Best Comedy at the 2014 Broadcast Awards.

In 2017 he starred on the West End in The Philanthropist, directed by Simon Callow. In his review, The Telegraph's theatre critic Dominic Cavendish wrote "Callow has certainly struck gold with leading man Simon Bird...he delivers the goods by subtle, incremental means, the thespian equivalent of a 3D printer".

Bird's debut stand-up show Debrief, recorded in an empty theatre, was released on All4 in 2022 and described by comedy website Chortle as "more like an experimental art-house movie than a stand-up special".

Bird stars in a new Channel 4 sitcom Everyone Else Burns, produced by Jax Media and NBC Universal, which was released in 2023.

Directing
In 2016, Bird directed his first short film Ernestine and Kit based on a story by Kevin Barry. It premiered at SXSW where it was nominated for the Grand Jury Award for Best Narrative Short. It was also nominated for Best Short Film at the 2016 Irish Television and Film Awards.

His debut feature film Days of Bagnold Summer, was released in 2020, backed by Creative England and the British Film Institute. It was described by Mark Kermode as "a gem of a movie...laugh-out-loud funny and piercingly poignant". It was nominated for the Variety Piazza Grande Award at the Locarno Film Festival and was named Best Feature at the LUCAS International Festival For Young Film Lovers. It currently has a 92% Fresh rating on Rotten Tomatoes.

For TV, Bird directed Series 3 of BAFTA-nominated mockumentary Pls Like and the first series of Rose D'Or-nominated sketch show Ellie & Natasia, described by The Times as "the funniest and most refreshing take on the format for years".

Producing
In 2015 Bird and Jonny Sweet founded Guilty Party Pictures, an independent TV and film production company backed by StudioCanal. It produced a number of projects including God's Own County, nominated for Best Short-Form Comedy at the 2019 Broadcast Awards, How Europe Stole My Mum, described by The Guardian as "nothing short of a miracle", and How We Forgot To Save The Planet, which won the 2022 RTS Scotland Award for Best Comedy.

In 2022 it was announced that Bird and Sweet were setting up a new company, People Person Pictures, in partnership with BBC Studios. People Person Pictures was named as a co-producing partner on Wicked Little Letters, a feature film starring Olivia Colman, Jessie Buckley and Timothy Spall, to be released in 2024.

Personal life
In 2012, Bird married author Lisa Owens. They have two children.

Bird is a supporter of Crystal Palace Football Club.

Filmography

Film

Television

References

External links

 

1984 births
Living people
21st-century English comedians
21st-century English male actors
Actors from Guildford
Alumni of Birkbeck, University of London
Alumni of Queens' College, Cambridge
English male comedians
English male film actors
English male television actors
English male writers
English stand-up comedians
Male actors from Surrey
People educated at Royal Grammar School, Guildford